There have been two Baronetcies created for persons with the surname Pile, one in the Baronetage of England and one in the Baronetage of the United Kingdom.

The Pile Baronetcy, of Compton in the County of Berkshire, was created in the Baronetage of England on 12 September 1628 for Francis Pile. The second Baronet represented Berkshire in the House of Commons. The title became extinct on the death of the sixth Baronet in 1761.

The Pile Baronetcy, of Kenilworth House in Rathgar in the County of Dublin, was created in the Baronetage of the United Kingdom on 24 September 1900 for Thomas Devereux Pile, Lord Mayor of Dublin in 1900. His son, the second Baronet, was a General in the Army. As of 2010 the title is held by the latter's grandson, the fourth Baronet.

Pile baronets, of Compton (1628)
Sir Francis Pile, 1st Baronet (1589–1635) 
Sir Francis Pile, 2nd Baronet (–1649) 
Sir Seymour Pile, 3rd Baronet (–) 
Sir Francis Pile, 4th Baronet (died ) 
Sir Seymour Pile, 5th Baronet (died ) 
Sir Francis Pile, 6th Baronet (died 1761)

Pile baronets, of Kenilworth House (1900)
Sir Thomas Devereux Pile, 1st Baronet (1856–1931) 
Sir Frederick Alfred Pile, 2nd Baronet (1884–1976) 
Sir Frederick Devereux Pile, 3rd Baronet (1915–2010)
Sir Anthony John Devereux Pile, 4th Baronet (born 1947)

References

Kidd, Charles, Williamson, David (editors). Debrett's Peerage and Baronetage (1990 edition). New York: St Martin's Press, 1990.

Baronetcies in the Baronetage of the United Kingdom
Extinct baronetcies in the Baronetage of England